Hazelbrook is a town situated in New South Wales, Australia (Elevation: 675 metres) It is located 91 kilometres west of Sydney and 16 kilometres east of Katoomba in the Blue Mountains on the Great Western Highway.

History and description

The town was named after Hazelbrook House, built in the 1870s by Svonte Noles. The name Hazelbrook was adopted in 1894 when the Hazelbrook railway station was opened opposite the home. Hazelbrook House no longer exists but Selwood House is a heritage-listed building in the nearby vicinity and now houses a veterinary practice. Other attractions in the area include Terrace Falls, Victor Falls and Bedford Pool on the south side of the village, plus Lyre Bird Glen, Oaklands Falls, Horseshoe Falls and Burgess Falls on the north side.

1st Hazelbrook scout group was established in 1922 and was part of the lower blue mountains district and is now part of blue mountains district.
1st Hazelbrook scout group is on of 5 scouts group in the blue mountains.
On 16th October 2022 1st Hazelbrook scout group celebrated They 100th anniversary

The village is serviced by a number of schools; Hazelbrook Public School (kindergarten to Year 6), the humanist Korowal School (Kindergarten to HSC), Blue Mountains Steiner (Pre-School to Year 6) and two child care centres.

There is a shopping centre that includes a supermarket and several shops, restaurants and cafes.

Hazelbrook volunteer Rural Fire brigade established in 1959 by the local community and is one of 26 rural fire brigade in the blue mountains.
Hazelbrook rural fire brigade has 3 fire truck 
one category 1 fire tankers 
two category 7 fire tankers 
One PC

Hazelbrook has a local football club, known as the Hazelbrook Hawks, whose home ground is Gloria Park, and a lawn bowls club, co-located at Gloria Park.

Australian author James Roy lives in Hazelbrook.

Population
According to the 2021 census of Population, there were 5,077 people in Hazelbrook.
 Aboriginal and Torres Strait Islander people made up 4.5% of the population. 
 81.6% of people were born in Australia. The next most common country of birth was England at 4.9%.   
 91.1% of people spoke only English at home. 
 The most common responses for religion were No Religion 49.8%, Catholic 16.2% and Anglican 11.7%.

Gallery

See also
 Blue Mountains (Australia)
 Blue Mountains National Park
 Woodford, New South Wales
 Lawson, New South Wales
 Hazelbrook railway station

References

External links
 Hazelbrook Public School
 Korowal School
 Hazelbrook Volunteer Rural Bush Fire Brigade

Towns in New South Wales
City of Blue Mountains